The Acts of the Apostles (Práxeis Apostólōn) is the fifth book of the New Testament; it tells of the founding of the Christian Church and the spread of its message to the Roman Empire. 

Acts and the Gospel of Luke make up a two-part work, Luke–Acts, by the same anonymous author. It is usually dated to around 80–90 AD, although some scholars suggest 90–110 . The first part, the Gospel of Luke, tells how God fulfilled his plan for the world's salvation through the life, death, and resurrection of Jesus of Nazareth. Acts continues the story of Christianity in the 1st century, beginning with the ascension of Jesus to Heaven. The early chapters, set in Jerusalem, describe the Day of Pentecost (the coming of the Holy Spirit) and the growth of the church in Jerusalem. Initially, the Jews are receptive to the Christian message, but later they turn against the followers of Jesus. Rejected by the Jews, the message is taken to the Gentiles under the guidance of Paul the Apostle. The later chapters tell of Paul's conversion, his mission in Asia Minor and the Aegean, and finally his imprisonment in Rome, where, as the book ends, he awaits trial.

Luke–Acts is an attempt to answer a theological problem, namely how the Messiah of the Jews came to have an overwhelmingly non-Jewish church; the answer it provides is that the message of Christ was sent to the Gentiles because as a whole Jews rejected it. Luke–Acts can also be seen as a defense of the Jesus movement addressed to the Jews: the bulk of the speeches and sermons in Acts are addressed to Jewish audiences, with the Romans serving as external arbiters on disputes concerning Jewish customs and law. On the one hand, Luke portrays the followers of Jesus as a sect of the Jews, and therefore entitled to legal protection as a recognised religion; on the other, Luke seems unclear as to the future that God intends for Jews and Christians, celebrating the Jewishness of Jesus and his immediate followers, while also stressing how the Jews had rejected the Messiah.

Composition and setting

Title, unity of Luke – Acts, authorship and date
The name "Acts of the Apostles" was first used by Irenaeus in the late 2nd century. It is not known whether this was an existing name for the book or one invented by Irenaeus; it does seem clear that it was not given by the author, as the word práxeis (deeds, acts) only appears once in the text (Acts 19:18) and there it does not refer to the apostles but refers to deeds confessed by followers to the apostles.

The Gospel of Luke and Acts make up a two-volume work which scholars call Luke–Acts. Together they account for 27.5% of the New Testament, the largest contribution attributed to a single author, providing the framework for both the Church's liturgical calendar and the historical outline into which later generations have fitted their idea of the story of Jesus and the early church. The author is not named in either volume. According to Church tradition dating from the 2nd century, the author was the "Luke" named as a companion of the apostle Paul in three of the letters attributed to Paul himself; this view is still sometimes advanced, but "a critical consensus emphasizes the countless contradictions between the account in Acts and the authentic Pauline letters." (An example can be seen by comparing Acts's accounts of Paul's conversion (Acts 9:1–31, 22:6–21, and 26:9–23) with Paul's own statement that he remained unknown to Christians in Judea after that event (Galatians 1:17–24).) The author "is an admirer of Paul, but does not share Paul's own view of himself as an apostle; his own theology is considerably different from Paul's on key points and does not represent Paul's own views accurately." He was educated, a man of means, probably urban, and someone who respected manual work, although not a worker himself; this is significant, because more high-brow writers of the time looked down on the artisans and small business people who made up the early church of Paul and were presumably Luke's audience.

The earliest possible date for Luke-Acts is around 62 AD, the time of Paul's imprisonment in Rome, but most scholars date the work to 80–90 AD on the grounds that it uses Mark as a source, looks back on the destruction of Jerusalem, and does not show any awareness of the letters of Paul (which began circulating late in the first century); if it does show awareness of the Pauline epistles, and also of the work of the Jewish historian Josephus, as some believe, then a date in the early 2nd century is possible. The majority scholarly position is that the Lucan author did not know Josephus, and they hypothesise some lost historiographical sources that both Josephus and the author of the Acts of Luke had recourse
to use.

Manuscripts
There are two major textual variants of Acts, the Western text-type and the Alexandrian. The oldest complete Alexandrian manuscripts date from the 4th century and the oldest Western ones from the 6th, with fragments and citations going back to the 3rd. Western texts of Acts are 6.2–8.4% longer than Alexandrian texts, the additions tending to enhance the Jewish rejection of the Messiah and the role of the Holy Spirit, in ways that are stylistically different from the rest of Acts. The majority of scholars prefer the Alexandrian (shorter) text-type over the Western as the more authentic, but this same argument would favour the Western over the Alexandrian for the Gospel of Luke, as in that case the Western version is the shorter.

Genre, sources and historicity of Acts
The title "Acts of the Apostles" (Praxeis Apostolon) would seem to identify it with the genre telling of the deeds and achievements of great men (praxeis), but it was not the title given by the author. The anonymous author aligned Luke–Acts to the "narratives" (διήγησις, diēgēsis) which many others had written, and described his own work as an "orderly account" (ἀκριβῶς καθεξῆς). It lacks exact analogies in Hellenistic or Jewish literature. The author may have taken as his model the works of Dionysius of Halicarnassus, who wrote a well-known history of Rome, or the Jewish historian Josephus, author of a history of the Jews. Like them, he anchors his history by dating the birth of the founder (Romulus for Dionysius, Moses for Josephus, Jesus for Luke) and like them he tells how the founder is born from God, taught authoritatively, and appeared to witnesses after death before ascending to heaven. By and large the sources for Acts can only be guessed at, but the author would have had access to the Septuagint (a Greek translation of the Jewish scriptures), the Gospel of Mark, and either the hypothetical collection of "sayings of Jesus" called the Q source or the Gospel of Matthew. He transposed a few incidents from Mark's gospel to the time of the Apostles—for example, the material about "clean" and "unclean" foods in Mark 7 is used in Acts 10, and Mark's account of the accusation that Jesus has attacked the Temple (Mark 14:58) is used in a story about Stephen (Acts 6:14). There are also points of contacts (meaning suggestive parallels but something less than clear evidence) with 1 Peter, the Letter to the Hebrews, and 1 Clement. Other sources can only be inferred from internal evidence—the traditional explanation of the three "we" passages, for example, is that they represent eyewitness accounts. The search for such inferred sources was popular in the 19th century, but by the mid-20th it had largely been abandoned.

Acts was read as a reliable history of the early church well into the post-Reformation era, but by the 17th century biblical scholars began to notice that it was incomplete and tendentious—its picture of a harmonious church is quite at odds with that given by Paul's letters, and it omits important events such as the deaths of both Peter and Paul. The mid-19th-century scholar Ferdinand Baur suggested that the author had re-written history to present a united Peter and Paul and advance a single orthodoxy against the Marcionites (Marcion was a 2nd-century heretic who wished to cut Christianity off entirely from the Jews); Baur continues to have enormous influence, but today there is less interest in determining the historical accuracy of Acts (although this has never died out) than in understanding the author's theological program.

Audience and authorial intent
Luke was written to be read aloud to a group of Jesus-followers gathered in a house to share the Lord's supper. The author assumes an educated Greek-speaking audience, but directs his attention to specifically Christian concerns rather than to the Greco-Roman world at large. He begins his gospel with a preface addressed to Theophilus (Luke 1:3; cf. Acts 1:1), informing him of his intention to provide an "ordered account" of events which will lead his reader to "certainty". He did not write in order to provide Theophilus with historical justification—"did it happen?"—but to encourage faith—"what happened, and what does it all mean?"

Acts (or Luke–Acts) is intended as a work of "edification," meaning "the empirical demonstration that virtue is superior to vice." The work also engages with the question of a Christian's proper relationship with the Roman Empire, the civil power of the day: could a Christian obey God and also Caesar? The answer is ambiguous. The Romans never move against Jesus or his followers unless provoked by the Jews, in the trial scenes the Christian missionaries are always cleared of charges of violating Roman laws, and Acts ends with Paul in Rome proclaiming the Christian message under Roman protection; at the same time, Luke makes clear that the Romans, like all earthly rulers, receive their authority from Satan, while Christ is ruler of the kingdom of God.

Structure and content

Structure
Acts has two key structural principles. The first is the geographic movement from Jerusalem, centre of God's Covenantal people, the Jews, to Rome, centre of the Gentile world. This structure reaches back to the author's preceding work, the Gospel of Luke, and is signaled by parallel scenes such as Paul's utterance in Acts 19:21, which echoes Jesus's words in Luke 9:51: Paul has Rome as his destination, as Jesus had Jerusalem. The second key element is the roles of Peter and Paul, the first representing the Jewish Christian church, the second the mission to the Gentiles.
 Transition: reprise of the preface addressed to Theophilus and the closing events of the gospel (Acts 1–1:26)
 Petrine Christianity: the Jewish church from Jerusalem to Antioch (Acts 2:1–12:25)
 2:1–8:1 – beginnings in Jerusalem
 8:2–40 – the church expands to Samaria and beyond
 9:1–31 – conversion of Paul
 9:32–12:25 – the conversion of Cornelius, and the formation of the Antioch church
 Pauline Christianity: the Gentile mission from Antioch to Rome (Acts 13:1–28:31)
 13:1–14:28 – the Gentile mission is promoted from Antioch
 15:1–35 – the Gentile mission is confirmed in Jerusalem
 15:36–28:31 – the Gentile mission, climaxing in Paul's passion story in Rome (21:17–28:31)

Outline
 Dedication to Theophilus (1:1–2)
 Resurrection appearances (1:3)
 Great Commission (1:4–8)
 Ascension (1:9)
 Second Coming Prophecy (1:10–11)
 Matthias replaced Judas (1:12–26)
 the Upper Room (1:13)
 The Holy Spirit came at Shavuot (Pentecost) (2:1-47), see also Paraclete
 Peter healed a crippled beggar (3:1–10)
 Peter's speech at the Temple (3:11–26)
 Peter and John before the Sanhedrin (4:1–22)
 Resurrection of the dead (4:2)
 Believers' Prayer (4:23–31)
 Everything is shared (4:32–37)
 Ananias and Sapphira (5:1–11)
 Signs and Wonders (5:12–16)
 Apostles before the Sanhedrin (5:17–42)
 Seven Deacons appointed (6:1–7)
 Stephen before the Sanhedrin (6:8–7:60)
 The "Cave of the Patriarchs" was located in Shechem (7:16)
 "Moses was educated in all the wisdom of the Egyptians" (7:22)
 First mentioning of Saul (Paul the Apostle) in the Bible (7:58)
 Paul the Apostle confesses his part in the martyrdom of Stephen (7:58–60)
 Saul persecuted the Church of Jerusalem (8:1–3)
 Philip the Evangelist (8:4–40)
 Simon Magus (8:9–24)
 Ethiopian eunuch (8:26–39)
 Conversion of Paul the Apostle (9:1–31, 22:1–22, 26:9–24)
 Paul the Apostle confesses his active part in the martyrdom of Stephen (22:20)
 Peter healed Aeneas and raised Tabitha from the dead (9:32–43)
 Conversion of Cornelius (10:1–8, 24–48)
 Peter's vision of a sheet with animals (10:9–23, 11:1–18)
 Church of Antioch founded (11:19–30)
 term "Christian" first used (11:26)
 James the Great executed (12:1–2)
 Peter's rescue from prison (12:3–19)
 Death of Herod Agrippa I [in 44] (12:20–25)
 "the voice of a god" (12:22)
 Mission of Barnabas and Saul (13–14)
 "Saul, who was also known as Paul" (13:9)
 called "gods ... in human form" (14:11)
 Council of Jerusalem (15:1–35)
 Paul separated from Barnabas (15:36–41)
 2nd and 3rd missions (16–20)
 Areopagus sermon (17:16–34)
 "God...has set a day" (17:30–31)
 Trial before Gallio c. 51–52 (18:12–17)
 Trip to Jerusalem (21)
 Before the people and the Sanhedrin (22–23)
 Before Felix–Festus–Herod Agrippa II (24–26)
 Trip to Rome (27–28)
 called a god on Malta (28:6)

Content

The Gospel of Luke began with a prologue addressed to Theophilus; Acts likewise opens with an address to Theophilus and refers to "my earlier book", almost certainly the gospel.

The apostles and other followers of Jesus meet and elect Matthias to replace Judas as a member of The Twelve. On Pentecost, the Holy Spirit descends and confers God's power on them, and Peter and John preach to many in Jerusalem and perform healings, casting out of evil spirits, and raising of the dead. The first believers share all property in common, eat in each other's  homes, and worship together. At first many Jews follow Christ and are baptized, but the followers of Jesus begin to be increasingly persecuted by other Jews. Stephen is accused of blasphemy and stoned. Stephen's death marks a major turning point: the Jews have rejected the message, and henceforth it will be taken to the Gentiles.

The death of Stephen initiates persecution, and many followers of Jesus leave Jerusalem. The message is taken to the Samaritans, a people rejected by Jews, and to the Gentiles. Saul of Tarsus, one of the Jews who persecuted the followers of Jesus, is converted by a vision to become a follower of Christ (an event which Luke regards as so important that he relates it three times). Peter, directed by a series of visions, preaches to Cornelius the Centurion, a Gentile God-fearer, who becomes a follower of Christ. The Holy Spirit descends on Cornelius and his guests, thus confirming that the message of eternal life in Christ is for all mankind. The Gentile church is established in Antioch (north-western Syria, the third-largest city of the empire), and here Christ's followers are first called Christians.

The mission to the Gentiles is promoted from Antioch and confirmed at a meeting in Jerusalem between Paul and the leadership of the Jerusalem church. Paul spends the next few years traveling through western Asia Minor and the Aegean, preaching, converting, and founding new churches. On a visit to Jerusalem he is set on by a Jewish mob. Saved by the Roman commander, he is accused by the Jews of being a revolutionary, the "ringleader of the sect of the Nazarenes", and imprisoned. Later, Paul asserts his right as a Roman citizen, to be tried in Rome and is sent by sea to Rome, where he spends another two years under house arrest, proclaiming the Kingdom of God and teaching freely about "the Lord Jesus Christ". Acts ends abruptly without recording the outcome of Paul's legal troubles.

Theology

Prior to the 1950s, Luke–Acts was seen as a historical work, written to defend Christianity before the Romans or Paul against his detractors; since then the tendency has been to see the work as primarily theological. Luke's theology is expressed primarily through his overarching plot, the way scenes, themes and characters combine to construct his specific worldview. His "salvation history" stretches from the Creation to the present time of his readers, in three ages: first, the time of "the Law and the Prophets" (Luke 16:16), the period beginning with Genesis and ending with the appearance of John the Baptist (Luke 1:5–3:1); second, the epoch of Jesus, in which the Kingdom of God was preached (Luke 3:2–24:51); and finally the period of the Church, which began when the risen Christ was taken into Heaven, and would end with his second coming.

Luke–Acts is an attempt to answer a theological problem, namely how the Messiah, promised to the Jews, came to have an overwhelmingly non-Jewish church; the answer it provides, and its central theme, is that the message of Christ was sent to the Gentiles because the Jews rejected it. This theme is introduced in Chapter 4 of the Gospel of Luke, when Jesus, rejected in Nazareth, recalls that the prophets were rejected by Israel and accepted by Gentiles; at the end of the gospel he commands his disciples to preach his message to all nations, "beginning from Jerusalem." He repeats the command in Acts, telling them to preach "in Jerusalem, in all Judea and Samaria, and to the end of the Earth." They then proceed to do so, in the order outlined: first Jerusalem, then Judea and Samaria, then the entire (Roman) world.

For Luke, the Holy Spirit is the driving force behind the spread of the Christian message, and he places more emphasis on it than do any of the other evangelists. The Spirit is "poured out" at Pentecost on the first Samaritan and Gentile believers and on disciples who had been baptised only by John the Baptist, each time as a sign of God's approval. The Holy Spirit represents God's power (at his ascension, Jesus tells his followers, "You shall receive power when the Holy Spirit has come upon you"): through it the disciples are given speech to convert thousands in Jerusalem, forming the first church (the term is used for the first time in Acts 5).

One issue debated by scholars is Luke's political vision regarding the relationship between the early church and the Roman Empire. On the one hand, Luke generally does not portray this interaction as one of direct conflict. Rather, there are ways in which each may have considered having a relationship with the other rather advantageous to its own cause. For example, early Christians may have appreciated hearing about the protection Paul received from Roman officials against Gentile rioters in Philippi (Acts 16:16–40) and Ephesus (Acts 19:23–41), and against Jewish rioters on two occasions (Acts 17:1–17; Acts 18:12–17). Meanwhile, Roman readers may have approved of Paul's censure of the illegal practice of magic (Acts 19:17–19) as well as the amicability of his rapport with Roman officials such as Sergius Paulus (Acts 13:6–12) and Festus (Acts 26:30–32). Furthermore, Acts does not include any account of a struggle between Christians and the Roman government as a result of the latter's imperial cult. Thus Paul is depicted as a moderating presence between the church and the Roman Empire.

On the other hand, events such as the imprisonment of Paul at the hands of the empire (Acts 22–28) as well as several encounters that reflect negatively on Roman officials (for instance, Felix's desire for a bribe from Paul in Acts 24:26) function as concrete points of conflict between Rome and the early church. Perhaps the most significant point of tension between Roman imperial ideology and Luke's political vision is reflected in Peter's speech to the Roman centurion, Cornelius (Acts 10:36). Peter states that "this one" [οὗτος], i.e. Jesus, "is lord [κύριος] of all." The title, κύριος, was often ascribed to the Roman emperor in antiquity, rendering its use by Luke as an appellation for Jesus an unsubtle challenge to the emperor's authority.

Comparison with other writings

Gospel of Luke
As the second part of the two-part work Luke–Acts, Acts has significant links to the Gospel of Luke. Major turning points in the structure of Acts, for example, find parallels in Luke: the presentation of the child Jesus in the Temple parallels the opening of Acts in the Temple, Jesus's forty days of testing in the wilderness prior to his mission parallel the forty days prior to his Ascension in Acts, the mission of Jesus in Samaria and the Decapolis (the lands of the Samaritans and Gentiles) parallels the missions of the Apostles in Samaria and the Gentile lands, and so on (see Gospel of Luke). These parallels continue through both books. There are also differences between Luke and Acts, amounting at times to outright contradiction. For example, the gospel seems to place the Ascension on Easter Sunday, shortly after the Resurrection, while Acts 1 puts it forty days later. There are similar conflicts over the theology, and while not seriously questioning the single authorship of Luke–Acts, these differences do suggest the need for caution in seeking too much consistency in books written in essence as popular literature.

Pauline epistles
Acts agrees with Paul's letters on the major outline of Paul's career: he is converted and becomes a Christian missionary and apostle, establishing new churches in Asia Minor and the Aegean and struggling to free Gentile Christians from the Jewish Law. There are also agreements on many incidents, such as Paul's escape from Damascus, where he is lowered down the walls in a basket. But details of these same incidents are frequently contradictory: for example, according to Paul it was a pagan king who was trying to arrest him in Damascus, but according to Luke it was the Jews (2 Corinthians 11:33 and Acts 9:24). Acts speaks of "Christians" and "disciples", but Paul never uses either term, and it is striking that Acts never brings Paul into conflict with the Jerusalem church  and places Paul under the authority of the Jerusalem church and its leaders, especially James and Peter (Acts 15 vs. Galatians 2). Acts omits much from the letters, notably Paul's problems with his congregations (internal difficulties are said to be the fault of the Jews instead), and his apparent final rejection by the church leaders in Jerusalem (Acts has Paul and Barnabas deliver an offering that is accepted, a trip that has no mention in the letters). There are also major differences between Acts and Paul on Christology (the understanding of Christ's nature), eschatology (the understanding of the "last things"), and apostleship.

See also 

 Les Actes des Apotres
 Acts of the Apostles (genre)
 Historical reliability of the Acts of the Apostles
 Holy Spirit in the Acts of the Apostles
 List of Gospels
 List of New Testament verses not included in modern English translations
 The Lost Chapter of the Acts of the Apostles, also known as the Sonnini Manuscript
 Textual variants in the Acts of the Apostles

Notes

References

Bibliography

External links

 Book of Acts at Bible Gateway (NIV & KJV)
 Tertullian.org: The Western Text of the Acts of the Apostles (1923) J. M. WILSON, D.D.
 
  Various versions

 
1st-century books
1st-century Christianity
New Testament books
Acts of the Apostles (genre)